Patrick Walsh (born 14 June 1963) is an Irish retired hurler who played for Kilkenny Championship club Windgap. He played for the Kilkenny senior hurling team for a brief period, during which time he usually lined out as a right corner-forward.

Honours

Kilkenny
Leinster Senior Hurling Championship (2): 1986, 1987

References

1963 births
Living people
Windgap hurlers
Kilkenny inter-county hurlers